A Loving Father is a 2002 French film starring Gérard Depardieu, Guillaume Depardieu and Sylvie Testud. It was directed by Jacob Berger.

Plot 
Writer Leo Shepherd is informed that he has won the Nobel Prize. He lives in a village in the French Alps with his daughter, Virginie, who has given up her entire life for him, and he has an estranged son, Paul, who lives in the city. Leo makes his way to Sweden on a motorcycle, against the advice of his friends. Paul hears of his father having won the prize, and calls him to congratulate him, but his sister refuses to let Paul speak to their father. Still wishing to reconnect with his father, Paul sets off to find him. They first meet up at a petrol station, and later at the scene of an accident. Leo barely manages to survive. Taking advantage of the confusion, Paul kidnaps Leo, claiming that his father had not spent much time with him when he was growing up. Meanwhile, Leo's identification papers are found at the scene of the accident, and he is reported dead. Paul ties up Leo with yellow tape, and takes him on a road trip, giving Paul an opportunity to have his say and make Leo listen.

Cast 
 Gérard Depardieu : Leo Shepherd
 Guillaume Depardieu : Paul
 Sylvie Testud : Virginia
 Julien Boisselier : Arthur
 Hiam Abbass : Salma
 Jacques Frantz : Antoine Levy

References

External links 

2002 films
French drama films
Films directed by Jacob Berger
2000s French films